Autosticha chlorodelta is a moth in the family Autostichidae. It was described by Edward Meyrick in 1906. It is found in Sri Lanka.

The wingspan is 14–15 mm. The forewings are dark fuscous with a small basal ochreous-orange spot. The stigmata and a small pre-tornal spot are very obscurely darker, the plical obliquely before the first discal. There is a triangular ochreous-orange blotch extending on the costa from three-fifths to rather near the apex, and reaching more than half across the wing. The hindwings are dark grey.

References

Moths described in 1906
Autosticha
Moths of Asia